The X-Files Season 11 may refer to:

The X-Files Season 11 (comics),  published by IDW Publishing in 2015
The X-Files (season 11), broadcast by Fox Broadcasting Company in 2018